Chowlahiriyur is a hobli headquarter in Kadur Taluk Chikkamagaluru district, located about  from Hosadurga. Its population was 4,236 in 2011.

Economy
Agriculture is the main occupation, which is mainly dependent on rainfall. Important crops are ragi, jowar, oil seeds, horse gram, green gram, onion and green chilly. Coconut is an important plantation crop.

Recently, a considerable amount of the population has moved to the cities of Bengaluru, Davanagere and other cities.

Many people work in government offices and private sectors. Among all government jobs, teacher is the most sought after among students because of its short duration and less fees compared to other professional courses.

Places of worship
Shree Someshwara temple in the heart of the village which was renovated in 2000 and it is mainly worshiped by lingayath community. Every year Dasara Festival celebrated. JAMPA is the important festival celebrated once in 5 years.

There is a famous Shree Bhoga nanjundeshwara temple, situated in the heart of the city, is mainly worshipped by the Kuruba community. Yearly once karthika festival is done by the kurubas, it is the main important festival of this village and 12 yearly once 9 days jathra mahothsava is done by kurubas. It also a very important festival in this village.

There is an old temple that was built in the period of Hoysalas called as Chowdammana gudi or horala(horagala) gudi. Under the name of development, the whole interior walls have been changed to granite and the original walls of ancient time have been destroyed. 

Also having *Shree Banashankari Devi* temple, situated in the centre of the village and it is mainly worshiped by Devanga community. Banada hunnime is the famous festival grand celebrated by Devanga community in every year and also celebrate noolu hunnime festival.

Education
Education is considered very important. There are many teachers, engineers, public servants and few doctors who studied in the college of Chowlahiriyur. The village has 4 government primary schools, 2 private schools, government high school and one private high school, a pre-university college.

Public facilities
Facilities include a government primary health centre, public library, APMC market, Samudaya bhavana and Grama panchayat. Karnataka bank has a branch in the village.

Demographics

Religion
The population mainly consists of Hindus and a few Muslims. The Hindu caste are more in number than in other communities.

=Religious activities and festivals            
Shri someswara jathra mahotsava will be done. it is an important festival of the village people from different places will come to see the festival.

Language
Kannada is the main spoken language. Urdu is also spoken by the Muslim community. A few families speak Tamil. Many people also can speak Hindi, English, Telugu, Marathi, etc.

References

Villages in Chikkamagaluru district